Don't Tell Everything is a 1921 American silent drama film directed by Sam Wood and starring Gloria Swanson and Wallace Reid. Wood apparently created this film in part from outtakes left over from Cecil DeMille's The Affairs of Anatol (1921). It is not known whether the film currently survives.

Plot
As described in a film magazine, Cullen Dale (Reid) becomes engaged to Marian Westover (Swanson), and when explaining various photographs showing him intimately juxtaposed between divers young women, spreads a network of falsehoods which promise to involve him in subsequent difficulty. One photograph shows him with Jessica Ramsey (Cumming), a sportswoman who calls her men friends "pals." Learning of Cullen's engagement, she courts his company so consistently that the piqued Marian precipitates a secret marriage. The honeymoon is interrupted by a quarrel which terminates with Cullen's departure for Jessica's hunting lodge. Here Jessica's love-making becomes obvious and the arrival of wife Marian and their mutual friend Harvey Gilroy (Dexter) finds Cullen ready to patch up their differences. After a suitable delay, Marian allows him to do so, with a happy ending ensuing.

Cast
 Wallace Reid as Cullen Dale
 Gloria Swanson as Marian Westover
 Elliott Dexter as Harvey Gilroy
 Dorothy Cumming as Jessica Ramsey
 Genevieve Blinn as Mrs. Morgan
 K. T. Stevens as Cullen's niece (as Baby Gloria Wood)
 Charles De Briac as Morgan Twin (as De Briac Twins)
 Raymond De Briac as Morgan Twin (as De Briac Twins)

See also
List of lost films
Wallace Reid filmography

References

External links

Film stills and poster at silenthollywood.com

1921 films
1921 drama films
Silent American drama films
American silent feature films
American black-and-white films
Films directed by Sam Wood
Lost American films
1921 lost films
Lost drama films
1920s American films